Adjuvant System 04 or AS04 is a trade name for combination of adjuvants used in various vaccine products by GlaxoSmithKline, in particular the Fendrix hepatitis B vaccine. It is also one of the ingredients of the human papillomavirus vaccine (HPV). Studies of AS04-adjuvanted HPV vaccine showed high and justified immune response against to HPV antigens. Furthermore, patients who took HPV-16/18 AS04-adjuvanted vaccine previously showed strong rapid responses upon receiving subsequent doses.

It consists of aluminum hydroxide and monophosphoryl lipid A (MPL). Furthermore, it is the successor of AS03 which is a squalene based adjuvant approved for pandemic vaccine by the EMA.

The heightened immune response was caused by the MPL component in AS04 which increased NF-kB and cytokine production. The aluminum hydroxide component in AS04 made the response last for a longer period of time. This is the reason why the HPV-16/18 AS04-adjuvanted vaccine was shown to be more efficient compared to an aluminum salt-adjuvanted formulation with a higher level of antibodies found in the body.

References

External links

See also
2009 flu pandemic

Adjuvants